The Pentax Optio E60 is a digital compact camera announced by Pentax on July 31, 2008. It uses AA batteries and therefore does not depend on a proprietary charger.

References

http://www.dpreview.com/products/pentax/compacts/pentax_optioe60/specifications

Pentax cameras
Cameras introduced in 2008